Churchfield can refer to 
 Churchfield Road in Acton, London, England
 Churchfield, County Mayo a townland in County Mayo, Ireland
 Churchfield, County Cork in County Cork, Ireland